Fifth Republic may refer to:

Governments

Africa
 Fifth Republic of Niger (1999–2009)

Americas
 Fifth Brazilian Republic (1964–1985)
Fifth Republic of Venezuela (1999–present)

Asia
 Fifth Republic of Korea (1981–1987)
 Fifth Republic of the Philippines (1986–present)

Europe
 Fifth Republic of Czechoslovakia (1990–1992)
 French Fifth Republic (1958–present)
 Fifth Roman Republic (1849–1849)

Other
 5th Republic (TV series), a 2005 South Korean drama series 
 Fifth Republic Movement, in Venezuela

See also

 First Republic
 Second Republic
 Third Republic
 Fourth Republic
 Sixth Republic
 Seventh Republic